The swimming competition at the 1994 Commonwealth Games in Victoria, British Columbia counted a total number of 34 medal events.

Medalists

Medal table

Key
 Host nation

Men

Women

Paralympic

See also
 Swimming at the 1992 Summer Olympics
 Swimming at the 1996 Summer Olympics

1994 Commonwealth Games events
1994 in swimming
1994